The Radisson Blu Scandinavia Hotel, Oslo is a hotel  in Oslo,  Norway, just east of the Palace Park near Holbergs plass. The 22-story,  488-room hotel is Oslo's third tallest building.

History
The hotel was constructed by the SAS Catering & Hotels division of Scandinavian Airlines System. It opened in June 1975 as the Hotel Scandinavia, operated by the US-based Western International Hotels chain, which was renamed Westin Hotels in 1981. Westin ceased operating the Hotel Scandinavia on December 1, 1983, and it was renamed SAS Hotel Scandinavia, with the airline operating it directly through their SAS Hotels subsidiary. In 1987 it was renamed slightly, becoming SAS Scandinavia Hotel. In 1994, the hotel was renamed Radisson SAS Scandinavia Hotel Oslo when SAS and Radisson Hotels signed a joint marketing agreement. When SAS and Radisson ceased the marketing agreement in February 2009, the hotel remained with Radisson and was renamed the Radisson Blu Scandinavia Hotel, Oslo.

See also
Radisson Blu Plaza Hotel, Oslo

References

External links 
Hotel website

Hotels in Oslo
Radisson Blu
Hotel buildings completed in 1975
Hotels established in 1975
1975 establishments in Norway
Rezidor Hotel Group